This was the first edition of the tournament.

Maria Sanchez and Fanny Stollár won the title, defeating Cornelia Lister and Renata Voráčová in the final, 7–5, 6–1.

Seeds

Draw

References

External Links
 Main Draw

Abierto Zapopan
Abierto Zapopan – Doubles